This is an alphabetical list of populated places in the Netherlands.

A
Aadorp -
Aagtdorp -
Aagtekerke -
Aalbeek -
Aalburg -
Aalden -
Aalsmeer -
Aalsmeerderbrug -
Aalst, Buren -
Aalst, North Brabant -
Aalst, Zaltbommel -
Aalsum, Friesland -
Aalsum, Groningen -
Aalten -
Aardenburg -
Aarlanderveen -
Aarle-Rixtel -
Aartswoud -
Abbega -
Abbenbroek -
Abbenes -
Abcoude -
Absdale -
Abshoven -
Achlum -
Achterberg -
Achterste Erm -
Achterveld -
Achthuizen -
Achtmaal -
Achttienhoven, South Holland -
Achttienhoven, Utrecht -
Acquoy -
Adorp -
Aduard -
Aduarderzijl -
Aegum -
Aerdenhout -
Aerdt -
Afferden, Gelderland -
Afferden, Limburg -
Agelo -
Aijen -
Akersloot -
Akkrum -
Akmarijp -
Albergen -
Alblasserdam -
Aldeboarn -
Alem -
Alkmaar -
Allingawier -
Almelo -
Almen -
Almere -
Almkerk -
Alphen aan den Rijn -
Alphen, Gelderland -
Alphen, North Brabant -
Alteveer, Roden -
Alteveer, Zuidwolde -
Alteveer, Groningen -
Altforst -
Alverna -
Ambt Delden -
Amby -
Ameide -
Ameland -
Amen -
America -
Amerongen -
Amersfoort -
Ammerstol -
Ammerzoden -
Ampsen -
Amstelhoek -
Amstelveen -
Amstenrade -
Amsterdam -
Amsweer -
Andel -
Andelst -
Anderen -
Andijk -
Ane -
Anerveen -
Anevelde -
Angeren -
Angerlo -
Anjum -
Ankeveen -
Ankum -
Anloo -
Anna Jacobapolder -
Anna Paulowna -
Annen -
Annerveensche Kanaal -
Ansen -
Apeldoorn -
Appelscha -
Appeltern -
Appingedam -
Arcen -
Archem -
Arkel -
Armhoede -
Arnemuiden -
Arnhem -
Arriën -
Arriërveld -
Arum -
Asch -
Asperen -
Assel -
Asselt -
Assen -
Assendelft -
Assum -
Asten -
Augsbuurt -
Augustinusga -
Austerlitz -
Avenhorn -
Avest -
Axel -
Azelo -
Azewijn

B
Baaiduinen -
Baak -
Baambrugge -
Baard -
Baardwijk -
Baarland -
Baarle-Nassau -
Baarlo, Limburg -
Baarlo, Overijssel -
Baarn -
Baars -
Baarschot -
Baarsdorpermeer -
Babberich -
Babyloniënhoek -
Badhoevedorp -
Baexem -
Baflo -
Baijum -
Bakel -
Bakhuizen -
Bakkeveen -
Bakkum -
Balgoij -
Balinge -
Balk -
Balkbrug -
Ballo -
Balloërveld -
Ballum -
Baneheide -
Banholt -
Bant -
Bantega -
Barchem -
Barendrecht -
Bareveld -
Barger-Compascuum -
Barger-Oosterveld -
Barlo -
Barneveld -
Barnflair -
Barsingerhorn -
Bartlehiem gem. Ferweradeel -
Bartlehiem gem. Tietjerksteradeel -
Basse -
Batenburg -
Bath -
Bathmen -
Bavel -
Beckum -
Bedum -
Beegden -
Beek en Donk -
Beek gem. Bergh -
Beek -
Beekbergen -
Beek-Ubbergen -
Beemte Broekland -
Beers, Friesland -
Beers, Noord-Brabant -
Beersdal -
Beerta -
Beerze -
Beerzerveld -
Beesd -
Beesel -
Beetgum -
Beetgumermolen -
Beets -
Beetsterzwaag -
Beilen -
Beinsdorp -
Bekveld -
Belfeld -
Bellingwolde -
Beltrum -
Belt-Schutsloot -
Bemelen -
Bemmel -
Beneden-Leeuwen -
Bennebroek -
Bennekom -
Benneveld -
Benningbroek -
Benschop -
Bentelo -
Benthuizen -
Bentveld -
Berg aan de Maas -
Berg en Dal -
Berg en Terblijt -
Bergambacht -
Bergen aan Zee -
Bergen, Limburg -
Bergen, North Holland -
Bergen op Zoom -
Bergenhuizen -
Bergentheim -
Bergeyk -
Bergharen -
Berghem -
Berghuizen -
Bergschenhoek -
Bergum -
Beringe -
Berkel en Rodenrijs -
Berkelaar -
Berkel-Enschot -
Berken-Enschot -
Berkenwoude -
Berkhout -
Berkmeer -
Berkum -
Berlicum -
Berlikum -
Bern -
Besoyen -
Best -
Besthmen -
Beugen -
Beuningen, Gelderland -
Beuningen, Overijssel -
Beusichem -
Beutenaken -
Beverwijk -
Biddinghuizen -
Bierum -
Biervliet -
Biest-Houtakker -
Biezelinge -
Biezenmortel -
Biggekerke -
Bilderdam -
Bilthoven -
Bingelrade -
Bingerden -
Binnenwijzend -
Birdaard -
Blaaksedijk -
Bladel -
Blankenham -
Blaricum -
Blauwhuis -
Bleijerheide -
Bleiswijk -
Blerick -
Blesdijke -
Bleskensgraaf -
Blessum -
Blija -
Blijham -
Blitterswijck -
Bloemendaal -
Blokhuizen -
Blokker -
Blokzijl -
Bobeldijk -
Bocholz -
Bodegraven -
Boekel -
Boekelo -
Boelenslaan -
Boer -
Boerakker -
Boerakker gem. Leek -
Boerdonk -
Boerhaar -
Boesingheliede -
Boijl -
Bokhoven -
Boksum -
Bollingawier -
Bolnes -
Bolsward -
Bontebok -
Boornbergum -
Boornzwaag -
Borculo -
Borger -
Borgercompagnie -
Borghalen -
Borgsweer -
Borkel en Schaft -
Born -
Borne -
Bornerbroek -
Bornwird -
Borssele -
Bosch en Duin -
Boschoord -
Boskoop -
Bosschenhoofd -
Botlek -
Boukoul -
Bourtange -
Boven Hardinxveld -
Bovenkarspel -
Bovenkerk -
Boven-Leeuwen -
Bovensmilde -
Boxmeer -
Boxtel -
Bozum -
Braamt -
Brakel -
Brandwijk -
Brantgum -
Breda -
Bredevoort -
Breedenbroek -
Breezand -
Breezanddijk -
Breklenkamp -
Breskens -
Breugel -
Breukelen -
Breukeleveen -
Brielle -
Britil -
Britsum -
Britswerd -
Broek fr -
Broek in Waterland -
Broek op Langedijk -
Broekerhaven -
Broekhuizen, Drenthe -
Broekhuizen, Limburg -
Broekhuizenvorst -
Broekland -
Broeksterwâld -
Bronkhorst -
Bronneger -
Bronnegerveen -
Brouwershaven -
Brouwhuis -
Bruchem -
Brucht -
Bruchterveld -
Bruinehaar -
Bruinisse -
Brummen -
Brunssum -
Bruntinge -
Buchten -
Budel -
Budel-Dorplein -
Budel-Schoot -
Buggenum -
Buiksloot -
Buinen -
Buinerveen -
Buitenkaag -
Buitenpost -
Bunde -
Bunne -
Bunnik -
Bunschoten-Spakenburg -
Buren -
Buren, Friesland -
Buren, Gelderland -
Burgerbrug -
Burgerveen -
Burgervlotbrug -
Burgh-Haamstede -
Burgum -
Burgwerd -
Burum -
Bussum -
Buurmalsen -
Buurse

C
Cadier en Keer -
Cadzand -
Callantsoog -
Camerig -
Camperduin -
Capelle aan den IJssel -
Capelle -
Castelre -
Castenray -
Casteren -
Castricum -
Catrijp -
Catsop -
Chaam -
Chèvremont -
Clinge -
Coevorden -
Colijnsplaat -
Collendoorn -
Colmschate -
Cornjum -
Cornwerd -
Cortenoever -
Cothen -
Cottessen -
Creil -
Cromvoirt -
Cruquius -
Cuijk -
Culemborg

D
Daarle -
Daarlerveen -
Dale -
Dalem -
Dalen -
Dalerend -
Dalerpeel -
Dalerveen -
Dalfsen -
Dalmsholte -
Damwâld -
Daniken -
Darp -
De Bilt -
De Blesse -
De Bult -
De Cocksdorp -
De Glind -
De Goorn -
De Groeve -
De Haukes -
De Heen -
De Heurne -
De Hoef -
De Hoek -
De Hoeve -
De Kar -
De Kiel -
De Klencke -
De Klomp -
De Knipe -
De Koog -
De Kooy -
De Krim -
De Kwakel -
De Lier -
De Lutte -
De Marshoek -
De Meern -
De Moer -
De Mortel -
De Pol -
De Pollen -
De Poppe -
De Punt -
De Rijp -
De Stapel -
De Steeg -
De Tike -
De Valom -
De Vecht -
De Veenhoop -
De Waal -
De Weere -
De Wijk -
De Wilgen -
De Wilp -
De Woude -
De Zande -
De Zilk -
Dearsum -
Dedemsvaart -
Dedgum -
Deelen -
Deersum -
Deest -
Deil -
Deinum -
Delden -
Deldenerbroek -
Delfgauw -
Delfstrahuizen -
Delft -
Delfzijl -
Delwijnen -
Demen -
Den Andel -
Den Bommel -
Den Bosch -
Den Burg -
Den Dolder -
Den Dungen -
Den Haag -
Den Ham, Groningen -
Den Ham, Overijssel -
Den Helder -
Den Hoorn, Texel -
Den Hoorn, Zuid-Holland -
Den Hout -
Den Hulst -
Den Ilp -
Den Kaat -
Den Nul -
Den Oever -
Den Velde -
Denekamp -
Dennenburg -
Deurne -
Deurningen -
Deursen -
Deurze -
Deventer -
De Westereen -
Dichteren -
Didam -
Dielen -
Diemen -
Diepenheim -
Diepenveen -
Dieren -
Diessen -
Dieteren -
Diever -
Dieverburg -
Diffelen -
Dijken -
Dijkerhoek -
Dijkhuizen -
Dinteloord -
Dinther -
Dinxperlo -
Diphoorn -
Dirkshorn -
Dirksland -
Dishoek -
Dodewaard -
Doenrade -
Doesburg -
Doetinchem -
Doeveren -
Doezum -
Dokkum -
Dokkumer Nieuwe Zijlen -
Doldersum -
Domburg -
Dommelen -
Donderen -
Dongen -
Dongjum -
Doniaga -
Donk, Limburg -
Donk, Noord-Brabant -
Donkerbroek -
Doorn -
Doornenburg -
Doornspijk -
Doorwerth -
Dordrecht -
Dorkwerd -
Dorplein -
Dorregeest -
Dorst -
Dortherhoek -
Douvergenhout -
Draaibrug -
Drachten -
Drachtster compagnie -
Dreischor -
Drempt -
Dreumel -
Drie -
Driebergen -
Driebergen-Rijsenburg -
Drieborg -
Driebrunnen -
Driehuis -
Driehuizen -
Driel -
Driesum -
Driewegen -
Drijber -
Drimmelen -
Drogeham -
Drogteropslagen -
Drongelen -
Dronrijp -
Dronten -
Drouwen -
Drouwenermond -
Drouwenerveen -
Drumpt -
Drunen -
Druten -
Dubbeldam -
Duistervoorde -
Duiven -
Duivendrecht -
Duizel -
Dulder -
Durgerdam -
Dussen -
Duur -
Dwingeloo

E
Eagum -
Eastermar -
Echt -
Echteld -
Echten, Drenthe -
Echten, Friesland -
Echtenerbrug -
Echterbosch -
Eck en Wiel -
Eckelrade -
Edam -
Ede gld -
Edens -
Ederveen -
Ee -
Eede zld -
Eefde -
Eelde -
Eelderwolde -
Eemdijk -
Eemnes -
Eemshaven -
Eemster -
Een -
Eenigenburg -
Eenrum -
Eenum -
Een-West -
Eerbeek -
Eerde, Noord-Brabant -
Eerde, Overijssel -
Eernewoude -
Eersel -
Eerste Exloërmond -
Ees -
Eese -
Eesergroen -
Eeserveen Borger -
Eeserveen Odoorn -
Eesterga -
Eestrum -
Eesveen -
Eethen -
Eexsterveen -
Eexsterveensche Kanaal -
Eext -
Eexterzandvoort -
Egchel -
Egmond aan den Hoef -
Egmond aan Zee -
Egmond-Binnen -
Egmondermeer -
Eibergen -
Eierland -
Eijsden -
Eindhoven -
Einighausen -
Ekehaar -
Elahuizen -
Elburg -
Elden -
Eldersloo -
Eldrik -
Eleveld -
Elim -
Elkenrade -
Elkerzee -
Ell -
Ellecom -
Ellemeet -
Ellerhuizen -
Ellertshaar -
Ellewoutsdijk -
Elp -
Elsen -
Elsendorp -
Elshof -
Elshout -
Elsloo, Friesland -
Elsloo, Limburg -
Elspeet -
Elst, Gelderland -
Elst, Utrecht -
Emmeloord -
Emmen -
Emmer-Compascuum -
Empe -
Empel -
Emst -
Engelbert, Groningen -
Engelen -
Engelum -
Engwierum -
Enkhuizen -
Ens -
Enschede -
Enschot -
Enspijk -
Enter -
Enumatil -
Epe -
Epen -
Eperheide -
Eppenhuizen -
Epse -
Erica -
Erichem -
Erlecom -
Erm -
Ermelo -
Erp -
Esbeek -
Esch -
Escharen -
Espel -
Espelo -
Est -
Etenaken -
Etten gld -
Etten-Leur -
Europoort -
Eursinge gem. Ruinen -
Eursinge gem. Westerbork -
Euverem -
Everdingen -
Evertsoord -
Ewijcksluis Van -
Ewijk -
Exel -
Exloërveen -
Exloo -
Exmorra -
Eygelshoven -
Eys -
Eyserheide -
Ezinge -
Ezumazijl

F
Farmsum -
Feerwerd -
Ferwerd -
Ferwoude -
Fijnaart -
Finkum -
Finsterwolde -
Firdgum -
Fleringen -
Fluitenberg -
Fochteloo -
Follega -
Folsgare -
Formerum -
Fort -
Foudgum -
Foxham -
Foxhol -
Foxwolde -
Franeker -
Frederiksoord -
Friens -
Frieschepalen -
Froombosch

G
Gaanderen -
Gaarkeuken -
Gaast -
Gaastmeer -
Galder -
Gameren -
Gammelke -
Gapinge -
Garderen -
Garijp -
Garmerwolde -
Garminge -
Garnwerd -
Garrelsweer -
Garsthuizen -
Gassel -
Gasselte -
Gasselterboerveen -
Gasselternijveen -
Gasselter-Nijveensche-mond -
Gastel -
Gasteren -
Gasthuis -
Gauw -
Geelbroek -
Geerdijk -
Geersbroek -
Geersdijk -
Geertruidenberg -
Geervliet -
Gees -
Geesbrug -
Geesteren, Gelderland -
Geesteren, Overijssel -
Geeuwenbrug gem. Diever -
Geffen -
Gelderingen -
Geldermalsen -
Gelderswoude -
Geldrop -
Geleen -
Gellicum -
Gelselaar -
Gemert -
Gemonde -
Genderen -
Gendringen -
Gendt -
Genemuiden -
Gennep -
Genum -
Gerkesklooster -
Gerner -
Gersloot -
Gerwen -
Geulhem -
Geulle -
Geverik -
Geysteren -
Giekerk -
Giesbeek -
Giessen -
Giessenburg -
Giessendam -
Gieten -
Gieterveen -
Giethmen -
Giethoorn -
Gilze -
Glane -
Glanerbrug -
Glimmen -
Godlinze -
Goedereede -
Goënga -
Goëngahuizen -
Goes -
Goingarijp -
Goirle -
Goor -
Gorinchem -
Gorredijk -
Gorssel -
Gortel -
Gouda -
Goudriaan -
Goudswaard -
Gouerak -
Goutum -
Graauw -
Graetheide -
Grafhorst -
Graft -
Gramsbergen -
Grashoek -
Grathem -
Grave -
Greffelkamp -
Greonterp -
Grevenbicht -
Griendtsveen -
Grijpskerk -
Grijpskerke -
Groede -
Groenekan -
Groeningen -
Groenlo -
Groenveld -
Groesbeek -
Groessen -
Groet -
Groetpolder -
Grolloo -
Groningen -
Gronsveld -
Groot Dochteren -
Groot Genhout -
Groot-Ammers -
Groote Keeten -
Grootebroek -
Grootegast -
Grootschermer -
Grosthuizen -
Grou -
Grubbenvorst -
Gulpen -
Guttecoven

H
Haaften -
Haaksbergen -
Haakswold -
Haalderen -
Haamrade -
Haamstede -
Haaren -
Haarle gem. Hellendoorn -
Haarle gem. Tubbergen -
Haarlem -
Haarlemmerliede -
Haarlo -
Haarsteeg -
Haart -
Haarzuilens -
Haasdal -
Haastrecht -
Haelen -
Haerst -
Hagestein -
Haghorst -
Haler -
Halfweg -
Hall -
Halle -
Hallum -
Halsteren -
Hamert -
Handel -
Hardinxveld-Giessendam -
Hank -
Hansweert -
Hantum -
Hantumeruitburen -
Hantumhuizen -
Hapert -
Haps -
Harbrinkhoek -
Harculo -
Hardegarijp -
Hardenberg -
Harderwijk -
Haren, Groningen -
Haren, Noord-Brabant -
Harfsen -
Hargen -
Harich -
Haringhuizen -
Harkema -
Harkstede -
Harlingen -
Harmelen -
Harreveld -
Harskamp -
Hartwerd -
Haskerdijken -
Haskerhorne -
Hasselo -
Hasselt -
Hattem -
Hattemerbroek -
Haule -
Haulerwijk -
Hauwert -
Havelte -
Havelterberg -
Hazerswoude-Dorp -
Hazerswoude-Rijndijk -
Hedel -
Hedikhuizen -
Hee -
Heeg -
Heek -
Heel -
Heelsum -
Heelweg -
Heemserveen -
Heemskerk -
Heemstede -
Heenvliet -
Heer -
Heerde -
Heerenveen -
Heerewaarden -
Heerhugowaard -
Heerjansdam -
Heerle -
Heerlen -
Heerlerbaan -
Heerlerheide -
Heesbeen -
Heesch -
Heesselt -
Heeswijk-Dinther -
Heeten -
Heeze -
Hegelsom -
Hei- en Boeicop -
Heibloem -
Heide -
Heidenhoek -
Heijen -
Heijenrath -
Heijningen -
Heikant -
Heilig Land-Stichting -
Heiligerlee -
Heiloo -
Heinenoord -
Heinkenszand -
Heino -
Hekelingen -
Hekendorp -
Helden -
Helenaveen -
Hellendoorn -
Hellevoetsluis -
Hellouw -
Hellum -
Helmond -
Helvoirt -
Hem -
Hemelum -
Hemmen -
Hempens -
Hemrik -
Hendrik-Ido-Ambacht -
Hengelo, Gelderland -
Hengelo, Overijssel -
Hengevelde -
Hengforden -
Hengstdijk -
Hennaard -
Hensbroek -
Herbaijum -
Herkenbosch -
Herkenrade -
Herkingen -
Hernen -
Herpen -
Herpt -
Herten -
Hertme -
Herveld -
Herwen -
Herwijnen -
Herxen -
Hessum -
Het Koegras -
Het Loo -
Het Woud -
Heteren -
Heugem -
Heukelom -
Heukelum -
Heumen -
Heurne gem. Aalten -
Heurne gem. Ruurlo -
Heusden gem. Asten -
Heusden gem. Heusden -
Heveadorp -
Heveskes -
Heythuysen -
Hezingen -
Hiaure -
Hichtum -
Hidaard -
Hien -
Hierden -
Hieslum -
Hijken -
Hijkersmilde -
Hijlaard -
Hijum -
Hillegom -
Hilleshagen -
Hilvarenbeek -
Hilversum -
Hindeloopen -
Hintham -
Hippolytushoef -
Hitzum -
Hobrede -
Hoedekenskerke -
Hoek -
Hoek van Holland -
Hoenderloo -
Hoensbroek -
Hoenzadriel -
Hoevelaken -
Hoeven -
Hoge Hexel -
Hogebeintum -
Hogeweg -
Hollandsche Rading -
Hollandscheveld -
Hollum -
Holset -
Holsloot -
Holten -
Holterberg -
Holthees -
Holtherne -
Holthone -
Holtum -
Holwerd -
Holwierde -
Holysloot -
Hommert -
Hommerts -
Homoet -
Honselerdijk -
Honthem -
Hoofddorp -
Hoofdplaat -
Hoog Soeren -
Hoogblokland -
Hoogcruts -
Hooge Mierde -
Hooge Zwaluwe -
Hoogeloon -
Hoogengraven -
Hoogenweg -
Hoogerheide -
Hoogersmilde -
Hoogeveen -
Hoogezand -
Hooghalen -
Hoogkarspel -
Hoog-Keppel -
Hoogkerk -
Hoogland -
Hooglanderveen -
Hoogmade -
Hoogvliet rt -
Hoogwoud -
Hoonhorst -
Hoordwijkerhout -
Hoorn -
Hoorn Terschelling -
Hoornaar -
Hoornsterzwaag -
Hopel -
Horn -
Hornhuizen -
Horssen -
Horst aan de Maas -
Horst lb -
Hout lb -
Hout-Blerick -
Houten -
Houtigehade -
Houwerzijl -
Huijbergen -
Huinen -
Huins -
Huis ter Heide, Drenthe -
Huis ter Heide, Utrecht -
Huisduinen -
Huisseling -
Huissen -
Huizen -
Huizinge -
Hulhuizen -
Hulsberg -
Hulsel -
Hulsen -
Hulshorst -
Hulst -
Hulten -
Hummelo -
Hunnecum -
Hunsel -
Hupsel -
Hurdegarijp -
Hurwenen

I
Idaard -
Idsegahuizum -
Idskenhuizen -
Idzega -
IJhorst -
IJlst -
IJmuiden -
IJsselham -
IJsselmuiden -
IJsselstein -
IJzendijke -
IJzendoorn -
IJzeren -
IJzerlo -
IJzevoorde -
Illikhoven -
Ilpendam -
Indijk -
Ingber -
Ingen -
It Heidenskip -
Itnes -
Itteren -
Ittersum -
Ittervoort

J
Jaarsveld -
Jabeek -
Janum -
Jellum -
Jelsum -
Jipsingboermussel -
Jipsingboertange -
Jipsinghuizen -
Jirnsum -
Jislum -
Jisp -
Jistrum -
Jonkerslân -
Jonkersvaart -
Joppe -
Jorwerd -
Joure -
Jouswier -
Jubbega -
Julianadorp -
Junne -
Jutphaas -
Jutrijp

K
Kaag -
Kaalheide -
Kaart -
Kaatsheuvel -
Kadoelen -
Kakert -
Kalenberg -
Kallenkote -
Kalverdijk -
Kamerik -
Kampen -
Kampereiland -
Kamperland -
Kamperveen -
Kamperzeedijk -
Kantens -
Kapel-Avezaath -
Kapel-Avezaath gem. Buren -
Kapelle -
Kapellebrug -
Katlijk -
Kats -
Kattendijke -
Katwijk, North Brabant -
Katwijk, South Holland -
Katwijk aan de Rijn -
Katwijk aan Zee -
Katwoude -
Kedichem -
Keent -
Keijenborg -
Keinsmerbrug -
Kekerdom -
Keldonk -
Kelmond -
Kelpen -
Kerbuurt -
Kerk-Avezaath -
Kerk-Avezaath gem. Tiel -
Kerkdriel -
Kerkenveld -
Kerkrade -
Kerkwerve -
Kerkwijk -
Kessel, Limburg -
Kessel, Noord-Brabant -
Kesseleik -
Kesteren -
Kethel -
Keutenberg -
Kibbelveen -
Kiel-Windeweer -
Kijkduin -
Kijkuit -
Kilder -
Kimswerd -
Kinderdijk -
Kinnum -
Klaaswaal -
Klarenbeek -
Klazienaveen -
Klein Dochteren -
Klein Genhout -
Klein Ulsda -
Klein Zundert -
Kleine Huisjes -
Kleverskerke -
Klijndijk -
Klimmen -
Kloetinge -
Kloosterburen -
Kloosterdijk -
Kloosterhaar -
Klooster-Lidlum -
Kloosterzande -
Klundert -
Knegsel -
Kockengen -
Koedijk -
Koekange -
Koewacht -
Kogerpolder -
Kolderveen -
Kolderveense Bovenboer -
Kolderwolde -
Kolham -
Kolhorn -
Kollum -
Kollumerpomp -
Kollumerzwaag -
Kommerzijl -
Koningsbosch -
Koninngslust -
Koog aan de Zaan -
Kootstertille -
Kootwijk -
Kootwijkerbroek -
Kornhorn -
Kornwerderzand -
Kortehemmen -
Kortenhoef -
Kortgene -
Koudekerk aan den Rijn -
Koudekerke -
Koudum -
Koufurderigge -
Krabbendam -
Krabbendijke -
Kraggenburg -
Kranenburg -
Kreileroord -
Krewerd -
Krimpen aan de Lek -
Krimpen aan den IJssel -
Kring van Dorth -
Krommenie -
Krommeniedijk -
Kronenberg -
Kropswolde -
Kruiningen -
Kruisdijk -
Kruisland -
Kruispolderhaven -
Kruisweg, Groningen -
Kruisweg, Zuid-Holland -
Kubaard -
Kudelstaart -
Kuinre -
Kuitaart -
Kunrade -
Kwadendamme -
Kwadijk -
Kwintsheul

L
Laag Zuthem -
Laaghalen -
Laaghalerveen -
Laag-Keppel -
Laag-Soeren -
Lage Mierde -
Lage Vuursche -
Lage Zwaluwe -
Lageland -
Lambertschaag -
Lamswaarde -
Landerum -
Landgraaf -
Landhorst -
Landsmeer -
Langbroek -
Langedijke -
Langelille -
Langelo, Drenthe -
Langelo, Overijssel -
Langenboom -
Langeraar -
Langerak -
Langeveen -
Langeweg -
Langezwaag -
Langweer -
Lankhorst -
Laren, Gelderland -
Laren, Noord-Holland -
Lathum -
Lattrop-Breklenkamp -
Lauradorp -
Lauwersoog -
Lauwerzijl -
Ledeacker -
Leek -
Leende -
Leens -
Leerbroek -
Leerdam -
Leermens -
Leersum -
Leesten -
Leeuwarden -
Leeuwen -
Legemeer -
Leggeloo -
Leiden -
Leiderdorp -
Leidschendam -
Leimuiden -
Leimuiderbrug -
Lekkerkerk -
Lekkum -
Lellens -
Lelystad -
Lemele -
Lemelerveld -
Lemiers -
Lemmer -
Lemselo -
Lengel -
Lent -
Lenthe -
Lepelstraat -
Lerop -
Lettelbert -
Lettele -
Leuken -
Leunen -
Leur -
Leusden -
Leuth -
Leutingewolde -
Leuvenheim -
Leuvenum -
Leveroy -
Lewedorp -
Lexmond -
Lhee -
Lheebroek -
Lichtaard -
Lichtenvoorde -
Lichtmis -
Liempde -
Lienden -
Lierderholthuis -
Lieren -
Lierop -
Lies, Friesland -
Lies, North Brabant -
Lieshout -
Liessel -
Lievelde -
Lieveren -
Lijnden -
Limbricht -
Limmel -
Limmen -
Linde, Drenthe -
Linde gem. Diepenveen -
Linde, Gelderland -
Linden -
Linne -
Linschoten -
Lintelo -
Lintvelde -
Lioessens -
Lions -
Lippenhuizen -
Lisse -
Lisserbroek -
Lith -
Lithoijen -
Lobith -
Lochem -
Loenen a/d Vecht -
Loenen gem. Valburg -
Loenen, Gelderland -
Loenersloot -
Loënga -
Loerbeek -
Loil -
Lollum -
Lomm -
Longerhouw -
Lonneker -
Loo, Gelderland -
Loo, Overijssel -
Loon -
Loon op Zand -
Loosbroek -
Loosdrecht -
Loosduinen -
Loozen -
Lopik -
Lopikerkapel -
Loppersum -
Losdorp -
Losser -
Lottum -
Lucaswolde -
Luchthaven Schiphol -
Luchthaven Zuid-Limburg -
Luddeweer -
Luinjeberd -
Lunteren -
Lutjebroek -
Lutjegast -
Lutjewinkel -
Lutkewierum -
Luttelgeest -
Lutten -
Luttenberg -
Luxwoude -
Luyksgestel

M
Maarheeze -
Maarland -
Maarn -
Maarsbergen -
Maarssen -
Maarssenbroek -
Maartensdijk -
Maasbommel -
Maasbracht -
Maasbree -
Maasdam -
Maasdijk -
Maashees -
Maasland -
Maasniel -
Maassluis -
Maastricht -
Maasvlakte -
Macharen -
Made -
Makkinga -
Makkum, Drenthe -
Makkum, Littenseradiel -
Makkum, Súdwest-Fryslân -
Malden -
Mamelis -
Mander -
Manderveen -
Mantgum -
Mantinge -
Maren-Kessel -
Margraten -
Mariaheide -
Mariahoop -
Mariahout -
Mariaparochie -
Mariënberg -
Mariënheem -
Mariënvelde -
Marijenkampen -
Markelo -
Marken -
Markenbinnen -
Marknesse -
Markvelde -
Marle gem. Wijhe -
Marrum -
Marssum -
Martenshoek -
Marum -
Marwijksoord -
Mastenbroek -
Matsloot -
Maurik -
Mechelen -
Medemblik -
Meeden -
Meedhuizen -
Meerkerk -
Meerlo -
Meerstad -
Meerveld -
Meerveldhoven -
Meessen -
Meeuwen -
Megchelen -
Megen -
Meijel -
Melderslo -
Melick -
Meliskerke -
Melissant -
Menaldum -
Mensingeweer -
Meppel -
Meppen -
Merkelbeek -
Merslo -
Merum -
Mesch -
Meteren -
Meterik -
Metslawier -
Mheer -
Middelaar -
Middelbeers -
Middelbert -
Middelburg -
Middelharnis -
Middelie -
Middelrode -
Middelstum -
Middenbeemster -
Middenmeer -
Midlaren -
Midlum -
Midsland -
Midwolda -
Midwolde -
Midwoud -
Miedum -
Mierlo -
Mierlo-Hout -
Mijdrecht -
Mijnsheerenland -
Mijzen -
Mildam -
Milheeze -
Mill -
Millingen a/d Rijn -
Millingen Legerplaats -
Milsbeek -
Minnertsga -
Mirns -
Moddergat -
Moerdijk -
Moergestel -
Moerkapelle -
Moerstraten -
Molenaarsgraaf -
Molenend -
Molenhoek -
Molenrij -
Molenschot -
Molkwerum -
Monnickendam -
Monster -
Montfoort -
Montfort -
Mook -
Mookhoek -
Moordrecht -
Moorveld -
Morra -
Muggenbeet -
Muiden -
Muiderberg -
Mukkekeburen -
Mûnein -
Munnekemoer -
Munnekezijl -
Munstergeleen -
Muntendam -
Mussel -
Musselkanaal

N
Naaldwijk -
Naarden -
Nagele -
Nattenhoven -
Neck -
Nederasselt -
Nederhemert -
Nederhorst den Berg -
Nederland -
Nederweert -
Nederweert Eind -
Nederwetten -
Neede -
Neer -
Neerbeek -
Neerijnen -
Neeritter -
Neerkant -
Neerloon -
Nes aan de Amstel -
Nes, Ameland -
Nes gem. Boarsterhim -
Nes gem. Dongeradeel -
Nessersluis -
Netersel -
Nettelhorst -
Netterden -
Niawier -
Nibbixwoud -
Niebert -
Niehove -
Niekerk gem. de Marne -
Niekerk gem. Grootegast -
Niersen -
Nietap -
Nieuw-Beerta -
Nieuw Bergen -
Nieuw Dordrecht -
Nieuw Einde -
Nieuw en St. Joosand -
Nieuw Helvoet -
Nieuw Millingen -
Nieuw Zwinderen -
Nieuwaal -
Nieuw-Amsterdam -
Nieuw-Annerveen -
Nieuw-Balinge -
Nieuw-Beijerland -
Nieuw-Buinen -
Nieuwdorp zld -
Nieuwe Bildtzijl -
Nieuwe Krim -
Nieuwe Meer -
Nieuwe Niedorp -
Nieuwe Pekela -
Nieuwe Wetering -
Nieuwebrug, Friesland -
Nieuwebrug, Noord-Holland -
Nieuwediep -
Nieuwegein -
Nieuwehorne -
Nieuwendam -
Nieuwendijk -
Nieuwenhagen -
Nieuwenhoorn -
Nieuwer ter Aa -
Nieuwerbrug -
Nieuwerkerk aan den IJssel -
Nieuwerkerk -
Nieuweroord -
Nieuwersluis -
Nieuweschans -
Nieuweschild -
Nieuweschoot -
Nieuwe-Tonge -
Nieuw-Heeten -
Nieuwkoop -
Nieuwkuijk -
Nieuwland -
Nieuwlande -
Nieuw-Lekkerland -
Nieuwleusden -
Nieuw-Loosdrecht -
Nieuw-Namen -
Nieuwolda -
Nieuwpoort -
Nieuw-Roden -
Nieuw-Scheemda -
Nieuw-Schoonebeek -
Nieuwstadt -
Nieuwveen -
Nieuw-Vennep -
Nieuwvliet -
Nieuw-Vossemeer -
Nieuw-Weerdinge -
Nieuw-Wehl -
Niezijl -
Nifterik -
Nigteveld -
Nij Beets -
Nijbroek -
Nijeberkoop -
Nijega -
Nijehaske -
Nijeholtpade -
Nijeholtwolde -
Nijelamer -
Nijemirdum -
Nijensleek -
Nijetrijne -
Nijeveen -
Nijeveense Bovenboer -
Nijezijl -
Nijhuizum -
Nijkerk -
Nijkerkerveen -
Nijland -
Nijlande -
Nijmegen -
Nijnsel -
Nijswiller -
Nijverdal -
Nispen -
Nisse -
Nistelrode -
Nooitgedacht -
Noorbeek -
Noord Deurningen -
Noordbeesmster -
Noordbergum -
Noordbroek -
Noorddijk -
Noordeinde, Gelderland -
Noordeinde, Noord-Holland -
Noordeloos -
Noorden -
Noordgouwe -
Noordhoek gem. Klundert -
Noordhoek gem. Standaarbuiten -
Noordhorn -
Noordijk, Gelderland -
Noordijk, Overijssel -
Noordlaren -
Noord-Scharwoude -
Noordsche Schut -
Noord-Sleen -
Noordwelle -
Noordwijk, Groningen -
Noordwijk, Zuid-Holland -
Noordwolde, Friesland -
Noordwolde, Groningen -
Nootdorp -
Norg -
Notter -
Nuenen -
Nuis -
Nuland -
Numansdorp -
Nunhem -
Nunspeet -
Nuth -
Nutter

O
Obbicht -
Obdam -
Ochten -
Odijk -
Odilliapeel -
Odoorn -
Odoornerveen -
Oeffelt -
Oegstgeest -
Oeken -
Oene -
Oenkerk -
Oensel -
Oentsjerk -
Oerle -
Offingawier -
Ohé en Laak -
Oijen nb -
Oirlo -
Oirsbeek -
Oirschot -
Oisterwijk -
Okkenbroek -
Olburgen -
Oldeberkoop -
Oldeboorn -
Oldebroek -
Oldebroek Legerplaats -
Oldeholtpade -
Oldeholtwolde -
Oldehove -
Oldekerk -
Oldelamer -
Oldemarkt -
Oldenzaal -
Oldenzijl -
Oldeouwer -
Oldetrijne -
Oler -
Olland -
Olst -
Olterterp -
Ommel, Noord-Brabant -
Ommen -
Ommeren -
Ommerschans -
Onderdijk -
Onderendam -
Onderste Locht -
Onna -
Onnen -
Onstwedde -
Ooij gem. Ubbergen -
Ooijen lb -
Ool -
Oolde -
Ooltgensplaat -
Oost -
Oost-, West- en Middelbeers -
Oostbierum -
Oostburg -
Oostdijk -
Oosteind -
Oostendam -
Oosterbeek -
Oosterblokker -
Oosterboer -
Oosterend, Friesland -
Oosterend, Noord-Holland -
Oosterend, Terschelling -
Oosterhesselen -
Oosterhout, Gelderland -
Oosterhout, Noord-Brabant -
Oosterhuizen -
Oosterland, Noord-Holland -
Oosterland, Zeeland -
Oosterleek -
Oosterlittens -
Oosternieland -
Oosternijkerk -
Oosterstreek -
Oosterwierum -
Oosterwijk -
Oosterwijtwerd -
Oosterwolde, Friesland -
Oosterwolde, Gelderland -
Oosterzee -
Oost-Graftdijk -
Oosthem -
Oosthuizen -
Oostkapelle -
Oostknollendam -
Oostmahorn -
Oostrum -
Oost-Souburg -
Oostum -
Oostvoorne -
Oostwold gem. Leek -
Oostwold gem. Scheemda -
Oostwoud -
Oostzaan -
Ootmarsum -
Ootrum -
Ooy -
Opeinde -
Opende -
Ophemert -
Opheusden -
Opijnen -
Oploo -
Opmeer -
Oppenhuizen -
Opperdoes -
Oranje -
Oranjedorp -
Oranjewoud -
Orvelte -
Osingahuizen -
Ospel -
Oss -
Ossendrecht -
Ossenisse -
Ossenwaard zh -
Ossenzijl -
Oterdum -
Oterleek -
Othene -
Otterlo -
Ottersum -
Ottoland -
Oud Ade -
Oud Avereest -
Oud Gastel -
Oud Milligen -
Oud Ootmarsum -
Oud Sabbinge -
Oud Valkenburg -
Oud-Alblas -
Oud-Annerveen -
Oud-Beijerland -
Ouddorp zh -
Oude Bildtzijl -
Oude Leede -
Oude Leije -
Oude Meer -
Oude Niedorp -
Oude Pekela -
Oude Wetering -
Oude Willem -
Oudega gem. Gaasterlân-Sleat -
Oudega gem. Smallingerland -
Oudega gem. Wytbritseradiel -
Oudehaske -
Oudehorne -
Ouderkerk aan de Amstel -
Oudelande -
Oudemirdum -
Oudemolen, Drenthe -
Oudemolen, Noord-Brabant -
Oudenbosch -
Oudendijk, Noord-Brabant -
Oudendijk, Noord-Holland -
Oudenhoorn -
Ouderkerk aan den IJssel -
Oudeschand -
Oudeschild -
Oudeschip -
Oudeschoot -
Oudesluis -
Oude-Tonge -
Oudewater -
Oudezijl -
Oudkarspel -
Oudkerk -
Oudleusden -
Oud-Loosdrecht -
Oudorp -
Oud-Vossemeer -
Oudwolde -
Oud-Zevenaar -
Oud-Zuilen -
Ouwerkerk -
Ouwsterhaule -
Ouwster-Nijega -
Overasselt -
Overberg -
Overdinkel -
Overlangel -
Overloon -
Overschild -
Overslag -
Overveen -
Ovezande

P
Paasloo -
Padhuis -
Paesens -
Palemig -
Panheel -
Pannerden -
Panningen -
Papekop -
Papendrecht -
Papenhoven -
Papenvoort -
Parrega -
Partij -
Passewaay -
Paterswolde -
Peelo -
Peest -
Peins -
Peize -
Peizermade -
Peperga -
Pernis -
Persingen -
Pesse -
Petten -
 -
Philippine -
Piaam -
Piershil -
Pieterburen -
Pietersbierum -
Pieterzijl -
Pijnacker -
Pikveld -
Pingjum -
Plasmolen -
Poederoijen -
Poeldijk -
Polsbroek -
Polsbroekerdam -
Poortugaal -
Poortvliet -
Poppingawier -
Posterholt -
Prinsenbeek -
Puiflijk -
Punthorst -
Purmer -
Purmerend -
Purmerland -
Putbroek -
Puth -
Putte -
Putten -
Puttershoek

Q
Quirijnstok

R
Raalte -
Raamsdonk -
Raamsdonksveer -
Raard -
Raath -
Radewijk -
Radio Kootwijk -
Raerd -
Ramspol -
Randwijk -
Ransdaal -
Ransdorp -
Rasquert -
Rauwert -
Ravenstein -
Ravenswaay -
Ravenswoud -
Rechteren -
Reduzum -
Reek -
Reeuwijk -
Reijmerstok -
Reitsum -
Rekken -
Remmerden -
Renesse -
Renkum -
Renswoude -
Ressen -
Retranchement -
Reusel -
Reutje -
Reutum -
Reuver -
Rha -
Rheden -
Rhederveld gem. Bellingwedde -
Rhederveld gem. Vlagtwedde -
Rhee -
Rheeze -
Rheezerveen -
Rhenen -
Rhenoy -
Rhienderen -
Rhoon -
Ridderkerk -
Ried -
Riel -
Rien -
Riethoven -
Rietmolen -
Riihem -
Rijckholt -
Rijen -
Rijkevoort -
Rijnsaterwoude -
Rijnsburg -
Rijperkerk -
Rijpwetering -
Rijs -
Rijsbergen -
Rijsenburg -
Rijsenhout -
Rijsoord -
Rijssen -
Rijswijk, Gelderland -
Rijswijk, Noord-Brabant -
Rijswijk, Zuid-Holland -
Rilland -
Rimburg -
Rinnegom -
Rinsumageest -
De Rips -
Rockanje -
Roden -
Roderesch -
Roderwolde -
Roelofarendsveen -
Roermond -
Rogat -
Roggel -
Rohel -
Rolde -
Roodeschool -
Roodhuis -
Roodkerk -
Roordahuizum -
Roosendaal -
Roosteren -
Rooth -
Rosmalen -
Rossum, Gelderland -
Rossum, Overijssel -
Roswinkel -
Rothem -
Rotstergaast -
Rotsterhaule -
Rotterdam -
Rotterdam Albrands -
Rottevalle -
Rottum, Friesland -
Rottum, Groningen -
Rouveen -
Rozenburg, Noord-Holland -
Rozenburg, Zuid-Holland -
Rozendaal -
Rucphen -
Ruigahuizen -
Ruigezand -
Ruigoord -
Ruinen -
Ruinerwold -
Ruischerbrug -
Rumpen -
Rumpt -
Rustenburg -
Rutten -
Ruurlo

S
Saaksum -
Saasveld -
Saaxumhuizen -
Sambeek -
Sandfirden -
Santpoort-Noord -
Santpoort-Zuid -
Sappemeer -
Sas van Gent -
Sasput -
Sassenheim -
Sauwerd -
Schaarsbergen -
Schaesberg -
Schagen -
Schagerbrug -
Schagerwaard -
Schaijk -
Schalkhaar -
Schalkwijk -
Schalsum -
Schandelen -
Schandelo -
Schardam -
Scharendijke -
Scharmer -
Scharnegoutum -
Scharsterbrug -
Scharwoude -
Schaveren -
Scheemda -
Scheerwolde -
Schelle -
Schellingwoude -
Schellinkhout -
Schelluinen -
Schermerhorn -
Scherpenisse -
Scherpenzeel, Friesland -
Scherpenzeel, Gelderland -
Schettens -
Scheulder -
Scheveningen -
Schiedam -
Schiermonnikoog -
Schijf -
Schijndel -
Schilberg gem. Margraten -
Schilberg gem. Witten -
Schildwolde -
Schimmert -
Schin op Geul -
Schingen -
Schinnen -
Schinveld -
Schipborg -
Schiphol -
Schiphol-Centrum -
Schiphol-Oost -
Schiphol-Rijk -
Schipluiden -
Schoonbron -
Schoondijke -
Schoonebeek -
Schoonheeten -
Schoonhoven -
Schoonloo -
Schoonoord -
Schoonrewoerd -
Schoorl -
Schoorldam gem. Schoorl -
Schoorldam gem. Warmenhuizen -
Schore -
Schoterzijl -
Schouwerzijl -
Schraard -
Schuddebeurs Schouwen -
Schuilenburg, Friesland -
Schuilenburg, Overijssel -
Schuilingsoord -
Schuinesloot -
Schweiberg -
Sebaldeburen -
Seerijp -
Sellingen -
Serooskerke Schouwen -
Serooskerke, Walcheren -
Sevenum -
Sexbierum -
's Gravenmoer -
's-Graveland -
's-Gravendeel -
's-Gravenhage -
's-Gravenpolder -
's-Gravenzande -
's-Heer Abtskerke -
's-Heer Arendskerke -
's-Heer Hendrikskinderen -
's-Heerenberg -
's-Heerenbroek -
's-Heerenhoek -
's-Hertogenbosch -
Sibbe -
Sibculo -
Siddeburen -
Siebengewald -
Siegerswoude -
Sijbekarspel -
Sijbrandaburen -
Sijbrandahuis -
Silvolde -
Simonshaven -
Simpelveld -
Sinderen -
Sintjohannesga -
Sirjansland -
Sittard -
Slagharen -
Slangenburg -
Slappeterp -
Sleen -
Sleeuwijk -
Slenaken -
Sliedrecht -
Slijkenburg -
Slijk-Ewijk -
Slikkerveer -
Slochteren -
Slootdorp -
Sloten -
Sluis -
Sluiskil -
Smakt -
Smalle Ee -
Smallebrugge -
Smeermaas -
Smilde -
Snakkerburen -
Sneek -
Snelrewaard -
Snikzwaag -
Soerendonk -
Soest -
Soestdijk -
Soestduinen -
Soesterberg -
Someren -
Sommelsdijk -
Son -
Sondel -
Sonnega -
Spaarndam -
Spaarndam-West -
Spaarnwoude -
Spakenburg -
Spanbroek -
Spanga -
Spankeren -
Spannum -
Spaubeek -
Spekhoek -
Spekholzerheide -
Speuld -
Spier -
Spierdijk -
Spijk gem. Lingewaal -
Spijk gld -
Spijk gn -
Spijkenisse -
Spijkerboor dr -
Spijkerboor nh -
Spoolde -
Sprang-Capelle -
Sprundel -
Spui -
St Agatha -
St Anna ter Muiden -
St Annaland -
St Annaparochie -
St Annen -
St Anthonis -
St Geertruid -
St Gerlach -
St Hubert -
St Isidorushoeve -
St Jacobiparochie -
St Jansklooster -
St Jansteen -
St Johannesga -
St Joost -
St Kruis -
St Laurens -
St Maarten -
St Maartensbrug -
St Maartensdijk -
St Maartens-vlotbrug -
St Maartenszee -
St Michielsgestel -
St Nicolaasga -
St Odiliënberg -
St Oedenrode -
St Pancras -
St Philipsland -
St Willebrord -
Stad aan 't Haringvliet -
Stadskanaal -
Stampersgat -
Standdaarbuiten -
Staphorst -
Starnmeer -
Startenhuizen -
Stavenisse -
Staverden -
Stavoren -
Stedum -
Steenbergen gem. Roden -
Steenbergen gem. Zuidwolde dr -
Steenbergen nb -
Steendam -
Steenderen -
Steenenkamer -
Steensel -
Steenwijk -
Steenwijkerwold -
Steenwijksmoer -
Stegeren -
Steggerda -
Stein -
Stellendam -
Stepelo -
Sterksel -
Stevensbeek -
Stevensweerd -
Steyl -
Stieltjeskanaal -
Stiens -
Stiphout -
Stitswerd -
Stokkum, Gelderland -
Stokkum, Overijssel -
Stolpen -
Stolpervlotbrug -
Stolwijk -
Stompetoren -
Stompwijk -
Stoutenburg -
Stramproy -
Streefkerk -
Strijbeek -
Strijen -
Strijensas -
Stroe, Gelderland -
Stroe, North Holland -
Stroet -
Stroobos -
Strucht -
Stuifzand -
Suameer -
Suawoude -
Surhuisterveen -
Surhuizum -
Susteren -
Swalmen -
Swartbroek -
Sweikhuizen -
Swichum -
Swier -
Swifterbant -
Swolgen

T
't Buurtje -
't Goy -
't Haagje -
't Haantje -
't Harde -
't Loo Oldebroek -
't Rooth -
't Veld -
't Waar -
't Zand nh -
't Zandt gn -
Taarlo -
Teeffelen -
Teerns -
Tegelen -
Ten Arlo -
Ten Boer -
Ten Esschen -
Ten Post -
Ter Aar -
Ter Aard -
Ter Apel -
Ter Apelkanaal -
Ter Heijde -
Ter Hole -
Ter Idzard -
Terband -
Terborg -
Terdiek -
Tergracht gem. Ferweradeel -
Tergracht gem. Tietjerkstradeel -
Terheijden -
Terheijl -
Terhorne -
Terhorst -
Terkaple -
Terlinden -
Termunten -
Termunterzijl -
Ternaard -
Terneuzen -
Teroele -
Terschelling -
Terschelling Baaiduinen -
Terschelling Formerum -
Terschelling Hee -
Terschelling Hoorn -
Terschelling Kaart -
Terschelling Kinnum -
Terschelling Landerum -
Terschelling Lies -
Terschelling Midsland -
Oosterend, Terschelling -
Terschelling Seerijp -
Terschelling West -
Terschuur -
Tersoal -
Terwinselen -
Terwispel -
Terwolde -
Terzool -
Teteringen -
Teuge -
Texel -
Thesinge -
Thij -
Tholen -
Thorn -
Tibma -
Tiel -
Tiendeveen -
Tienhoven, Stichtse Vecht -
Tienhoven aan de Lek -
Tienray -
Tietjerk -
Tijnje -
Tilburg -
Tilligte -
Tinallinge -
Tinte -
Tirns -
Tjalhuizum -
Tjalleberd -
Tjarnsweer -
Tjerkgaast -
Tjerkwerd -
Tjuchem -
Tolbert -
Tolduik -
Tolkamer -
Tollebeek -
Tonden -
Tongeren gld -
Tongeren ov -
Tongerlo -
Toornwerd -
Treebeek -
Tricht -
Triemen -
Trimunt -
Trintelen -
Tripscompagnie -
Tubbergen -
Tuil -
Tuitjenhorn -
Tuk -
Tull en 't Waal -
Tungelroy -
Tweede Exloërmond -
Tweede Valthermond -
Twello -
Twijzel -
Twijzelerheide -
Twisk -
Tynaarlo -
Tzum -
Tzummarum

U
Ubach over Worms -
Ubachsberg -
Ubbenga -
Ubbergen -
Uddel -
Uden -
Udenhout -
Uffelte -
Ugchelen -
Uitdam -
Uitgeest -
Uithoorn -
Uithuizen -
Uithuizermeeden -
Uitwellingerga -
Uitwierde -
Uitwijk -
Ulestraten -
Ulft -
Ulicoten -
Ulrum -
Ulsda -
Ulvenhout -
Ureterp -
Urk -
Urmond -
Ursem -
Usquert -
Usselo -
Utrecht

V
Vaals -
Vaassen -
Vaesrade -
Valburg -
Valkenburg, Limburg -
Valkenburg, Zuid-Holland -
Valkenswaard -
Valkkoog -
Valthe -
Valthermond -
Van Ewijcksluis -
Varik -
Varsen -
Varssel -
Varsselder Veldhunten -
Varsseveld -
Vasse -
Veelerveen -
Veen -
Veendam -
Veenendaal -
Veenhuizen, Drenthe -
Veenhuizen, Noord-Holland -
Veeningen -
Veenklooster -
Veenoord -
Veenwouden -
Veere -
Veessen -
Vegelinsoord -
Veghel -
Velddriel -
Velden -
Veldhoven -
Veldhunten -
Velp, Gelderland -
Velp, Noord-Brabant -
Velsen-noord -
Velsen-zuid -
Velserbroek -
Velswijk -
Veltum -
Venebrugge -
Venhorst -
Venhuizen -
Venlo -
Venray -
Ven-Zelderheide -
Verwolde -
Vessem -
Vethuizen -
Veulen -
Vianen, Noord-Brabant -
Vianen, Zuid-Holland -
Vierakker -
Vierhouten -
Vierhuizen -
Vierlingsbeek -
Vierpolders -
Vijfhuizen -
Vijlen -
Vilsteren -
Vilt -
Vinkega -
Vinkel -
Vinkenbuurt -
Vinkeveen -
Visvliet -
Vlaardingen -
Vlagtwedde -
Vledder -
Vledderveen, Drenthe -
Vledderveen, Groningen -
Vleuten -
Vlieghuis -
Vlieland -
Vlierden -
Vlijmen -
Vlissingen -
Vlist -
Vlodrop -
Voerendaal -
Vogelenzang -
Vogelwaarde -
Volendam -
Volkel -
Vollenhove -
Volthe -
Vondelingenplaat rt -
Voorburg -
Voorhout -
Voorhout -
Voorschoten -
Voorst gem. Gendringen -
Voorst gem. Voorst -
Voorstonden -
Voorthuizen -
Vorchten -
Vorden -
Vorstenbosch -
Vortum-Mullem -
Vragender -
Vredenheim -
Vredepeel -
Vreeland -
Vreeswijk -
Vries -
Vriescheloo -
Vriezenveen -
Vriezenveensewijk -
Vrijhoeve-Capelle -
Vroomshoop -
Vrouwenakker -
Vrouwenparochie -
Vrouwenpolder -
Vught -
Vuile Riete -
Vuren

W
Waal -
Waalre -
Waalwijk -
Waarde -
Waardenburg -
Waarder -
Waardhuizen -
Waarland -
Waaxens gem. Dongeradeel -
Waaxens gem. Littenseradiel -
Wachtum -
Waddinxveen -
Wadenoijen -
Wadway -
Wagenberg -
Wagenborgen -
Wageningen -
Walem -
Walsoorden -
Wamel -
Wanneperveen -
Wanroij -
Wanssum -
Wanswerd -
Wapenveld -
Wapse -
Wapserveen -
Warder -
Warffum -
Warfhuizen -
Warfstermolen -
Warga -
Warken -
Warmenhuizen -
Warmond -
Warns -
Warnsveld -
Warstiens -
Wartena -
Waskemeer -
Waspik -
Wassenaar -
Wateren -
Watergang -
Waterhuizen -
Wateringen -
Waterlandkerkje -
Waubach -
Waver -
Waverveen -
Wechterholt -
Wedde -
Wedderveer -
Weebosch -
Weerdinge -
Weerselo -
Weert -
Weesp -
Wehe-Den Hoorn -
Wehl -
Weidum -
Weijerswold -
Weiteveen -
Weiwerd -
Wekerom -
Welberg -
Well, Gelderland -
Well, Limburg -
Wellerlooi\Welsrijp -
Welsum, Dalfsen -
Welsum, Olst-Wijhe -
Welten -
Wemeldinge -
Wengelo -
Wenum Wiesel -
Wergea -
Werkendam -
Werkhoven -
Wernhout -
Wervershoof -
Wesepe -
Wessem -
Westbeemster -
Westbroek -
Westdorp -
Westdorpe -
Westelbeers -
Westendorp -
Westenholte -
Westenschouwen -
Westerbeek -
Westerblokker -
Westerbork -
Westerbroek -
Westeremden -
Westergeest -
Westerhaar-Vriezenveensewijk -
Westerhoven -
Westerklief -
Westerland -
Westerlee -
Westernieland -
Westervelde -
Westervoort -
Westerwijtwerd -
West-Graftdijk -
Westhem -
Westhoek, Friesland -
Westhoek, Schouwen-Duiveland -
Westhoek, Walcheren -
Westkapelle -
Westknollendam -
Westlaren -
Westmaas -
West-Souburg -
West-Terschelling -
Westwoud -
Westzaan -
Wetering -
Weteringbrug -
Wetsens -
Wetsinge -
Weurt -
Wezep -
Wezup -
Wezuperbrug -
Wichmon -
Wieken -
Wieldrecht -
Wiene -
Wier -
Wierden -
Wieringerwaard -
Wieringerwerf -
Wierum -
Wiesel -
Wieuwerd -
Wijbosch -
Wijchen -
Wijckel -
Wijdenes -
Wijdewormer -
Wijhe -
Wijk aan Zee -
Wijk bij Duurstede -
Wijk en Aalburg -
Wijlre -
Wijnaldum -
Wijnandsrade -
Wijnbergen -
Wijngaarde zh -
Wijnjewoude -
Wijns -
Wijnvoorden -
Wijster -
Wijthmen -
Wilbertoord -
Wildenborch -
Wildervangsterdallen -
Wildervank -
Wilhelminadorp -
Wilhelminaoord -
Willemsdorp -
Willemsoord -
Willemstad -
Willeskop -
Willige Langerak -
Wilnis -
Wilp -
Wilsum -
Winde -
Windesheim -
Windraak -
Winkel -
Winneweer -
Winschoten -
Winssen -
Winsum, Friesland -
Winsum, Groningen -
Wintelre -
Winterswijk -
Wirdum, Friesland -
Wirdum, Groningen -
Wissenkerke -
Witharen -
Witmarsum -
Witte Paarden -
Wittelte -
Wittem -
Witten -
Witteveen, De Wolden -
Witteveen, Midden-Drenthe -
Wittewierum -
Woensdrecht -
Woerden -
Woerdense Verlaat -
Woeste Hoeve -
Woezik -
Wogmeer -
Wognum -
Woldendorp -
Wolfhaag -
Wolfhagen -
Wolfheze -
Wolphaardsdijk -
Wolsum -
Woltersum -
Wolvega -
Wommels -
Wons -
Workum -
Wormer -
Wormerveer -
Woubrugge -
Woudbloem -
Woudenberg -
Woudrichem -
Woudsend -
Wouterswoude -
Wouw -
Wouwse Plantage -
Wytgaard

X

Y
Yde -
Yerseke -
Ypelo, Enter -
Ypelo, Wierden -
Ypsecolsga -
Ysbrechtum -
Ysselsteyn

Z
Zaamslag -
Zaandam -
Zaandijk -
Zalk -
Zaltbommel -
Zandberg, Gelderland -
Zandberg, Groningen-Drenthe -
Zandberg, North Brabant -
Zandberg, Zeeland -
Zandeweer -
Zandhuizen -
Zandpol -
Zandvoort -
Zeddam -
Zeegse -
Zeeland -
Zeelst -
Zeerijp -
Zeewolde -
Zegge -
Zegveld -
Zeijen -
Zeijerveen -
Zeijerveld -
Zeilberg -
Zeist -
Zeldam -
Zelhem -
Zenderen -
Zennewijnen -
Zetten -
Zevenaar -
Zevenbergen -
Zevenbergschen Hoek -
Zevenhoven -
Zevenhuizen, Leek -
Zevenhuizen, Zuidplas -
Zierikzee -
Zieuwent -
Zijderveld -
Zijdewind -
Zijldijk -
Zijpersluis -
Zijtaart -
Zoelen -
Zoelmond -
Zoetermeer -
Zoeterwoude -
Zonnemaire -
Zorgvlied -
Zoutelande -
Zoutkamp -
Zuid-Beijerland -
Zuidbroek, Groningen -
Zuidbroek, South Holland -
Zuiddorpe -
Zuideinde, Langedijk -
Zuideinde, Overijssel -
Zuideinde, South Holland -
Zuideinde, Utrecht -
Zuideinde, Zaanstad -
Zuiderflevo -
Zuidermeer -
Zuiderwoude -
Zuidhorn -
Zuidlaarderveen -
Zuidland -
Zuidlaren -
Zuidoostbeemster -
Zuid-Scharwoude -
Zuidschermer -
Zuidveen -
Zuidveld -
Zuidvelde -
Zuidwolde, Drenthe -
Zuidwolde, Groningen -
Zuidzande -
Zuidzijde, Bodegraven-Reeuwijk -
Zuidzijde, Goeree-Overflakkee -
Zuidzijde, Korendijk -
Zuilichem -
Zuna -
Zunderdorp -
Zundert -
Zurich -
Zutphen -
Zuurdijk -
Zwaag -
Zwaagdijk -
Zwaanshoek -
Zwagerbosch -
Zwammerdam -
Zwanenburg -
Zwarsluis -
Zwartebroek -
Zwartemeer -
Zwartewaal -
Zweeloo -
Zweins -
Zwiggelte -
Zwijndrecht -
Zwinderen -
Zwolle

See also 
 List of cities in the Netherlands by province
 List of cities, towns and villages in the Netherlands by province

 
 1

de:Liste der Städte in den Niederlanden
et:Hollandi linnade loend
nds:Städer in de Nedderlannen
pt:Lista de cidades nos Países Baixos